The 2019–20 Swiss Basketball League (SBL) season was the 89th season of the top tier basketball league in Switzerland. On 13 March 2020, the season was ended prematurely due to the COVID-19 pandemic and no champion was declared.

Competition format
All teams would play two times against each other for completing 22 games per team.

The six first qualified teams would join the group for places 1 to 6 while the other six teams would play the group for places 7 to 12. These two groups would be played with a one-legged round-robin format, where all teams from group 1 to 6 and the two first qualified teams from the group for the seventh position would be qualified for the playoffs. In this intermediate stage, teams start with the points accumulated by the winnings achieved in the first stage.

The quarterfinals and the semifinals would be played as a best-of-five series while the final in a best-of-seven series.

However, due to the COVID-19 pandemic, the league ended with two rounds of the regular season without being played.

Teams 

The league was composed by 12 teams after Nyon, champion of the second tier, joined the league.

Regular season

League table

Results

Swiss clubs in European competitions

References

External links 
 

Championnat LNA seasons
Swiss
basketball
basketball